Gorica Aćimović (born 28 February 1985 in Banja Luka) is a retired Bosnian-Austrian handballer. Born in Bosnia and Herzegovina, she was granted Austrian citizenship in November 2007.

She received the Sports Ambassadorialship of the Republika Srpska plaque in 2010.

Achievements
Women Handball Austria:
Winner: 2005, 2006, 2007, 2008, 2009
ÖHB Cup:
Winner: 2005, 2006, 2007, 2008, 2009
Damehåndboldligaen:
Winner: 2010
Landspokalturnering:
Winner: 2010, 2011
EHF Champions League:
Winner: 2010
Finalist: 2008

References

External links
 Profile on the Austrian Handball Federation official website

1985 births
Living people
Sportspeople from Banja Luka
Serbs of Bosnia and Herzegovina
Austrian female handball players
Expatriate handball players
Bosnia and Herzegovina emigrants to Austria
Bosnia and Herzegovina female handball players
Austrian people of Bosnia and Herzegovina descent
Serb diaspora sportspeople